Karl Johan Ljungberg (22 November 1868 – 11 July 1943) was a Swedish civil engineer who was a professor at KTH Royal Institute of Technology. He also represented his native country at the 1908 Summer Olympics in Ryde, Isle of Wight, Great Britain in the 8 Metre, placing fifth.

Further reading

References

1868 births
1943 deaths
Engineers from Stockholm
Swedish civil engineers
Sailors at the 1908 Summer Olympics – 8 Metre
Swedish male sailors (sport)
Olympic sailors of Sweden
20th-century Swedish engineers